The akşa was the currency of the Tuvan People's Republic (Tannu-Tuva) between 1934 and 1944 and was equal to the Soviet ruble upon introduction. It was subdivided into 100 kɵpejek (cf. kopeck). Akşa in the Tuvan language (akça in many other Turkic languages) simply means "money".

History 

Prior to the introduction of the akşa, Tuva issued overprinted Russian and Soviet banknotes. The first series (issued in 1924) was overprinted with denominations in lan, with the number of lan equal to the face value of the (otherwise obsolete) Russian notes. The second series (issued 1933) carried overprints on Soviet notes in rubles and chervonets.

Coins were issued in 1934 in denominations of 1, 2, 3, 5, 10, 15 and 20 kɵpejek, a Tuvanized name for the Russian kopeck, with banknotes issued in 1935 and 1940 in denominations of 1 to 25 akşa. The names kɵpejek and akşa are spelled in Jaꞑalif.

Shortly after the Tuvan People's Republic was absorbed into the Soviet Union, the akşa was replaced by the ruble, with 1 akşa = 3.5 rubles.

Coins 

On the obverse of the coins - the name of the state and the issuing bank.

On the reverse - the nominal number and in words, the year of issue.

Banknotes

See also

 Akçe
 Manchukuo yuan
 Mengjiang yuan

External links

 Banknotes of Tuva. 
 Image of a three-kɵpejek coin

Currencies of Asia
Currencies introduced in 1934
Modern obsolete currencies
Aksa
1934 establishments in Asia
1944 disestablishments in the Soviet Union
History of the Tuvan People's Republic